Nesa von Aarberg (first recorded 1398, died before 1438) was a Swiss nun and the aunt of Rudolf Hofmeister, Schultheiss of Bern.

Born into a Neuchâtel ministerial family, she is recorded as the Regelmeisterin (head of discipline) of the Third Order of Saint Francis in Basel in 1405.

References

Swiss nuns
14th-century Swiss people
14th-century Swiss women